Eugene Whitney Shellworth (April 2, 1912 – July 2, 1997) was the mayor of Boise, Idaho, from 1961 to 1966. Elected in May 1961 and re-elected in November 1963, he lost a runoff election to Jay Amyx in late 1965, and then worked in banking; he had previous business experience in lumber and heavy equipment sales.

Shellworth was a 1935 graduate of the U.S. Naval Academy in Annapolis, Maryland. He played on the football team until a knee injury ended his playing career in his sophomore year. Shellworth served in the U.S. Navy during World War II.

Personal
Shellworth married Martha Buckley (1915–2005) of Tacoma, Washington in 1937, and they settled in Boise following the war. Their daughter Sandy (b. 1944) is a former World Cup alpine ski racer and a 1968 Olympian.

His father, Harry Shellworth (1877–1973), was a page during the first state legislature following statehood in 1890, and later worked in the forest products industry.

Shellworth and his parents are buried in Morris Hill Cemetery in Boise.

References

External links
City of Boise – Mayors of Boise, Past and Present
Idaho State Historical Society Reference Series – Corrected List of Mayors, 1867–1996
Boise Arts and History – Timeline – Mayors

Mayors of Boise, Idaho
1912 births
1997 deaths
20th-century American politicians
United States Navy personnel of World War II
United States Naval Academy alumni